Catalina Vera Cordero (Santiago, 1 November 1987) is a Chilean film and television actress, model, dancer and producer. Known mainly for being the winner of Cabaret Burlesque, having played Ingrid Parra in Vuelve temprano of TVN, and her performances in Verdades Ocultas, Directo al corazón and lo que callamos las mujeres . Aparecio en roommates donde realizo ecenas lesbicas.

Biography 
Catalina was born into a middle-class family in Santiago (Chile), daughter of Héctor Vera, a medical technologist and Jacquelinne Cordero, a pshychoterapist. Her name is inspired by queen Catherine the Great.

As a child she attended the Santa Catalina Labouré school and later the Mayor school of Peñalolén. Motivated by her parents, she took classes in Flamenco, Literature, Drawing, Contemporary Dance, Modeling and Bellydance.

She was soon attracted to the world of acting, especially from the time she participated in musicals such as "Cat's", "Chicago", and "Moulin Rouge" at her school.

Finished the school she decided to be an actress to be able to reach her dream, to be an worldwide recognized actress. Catalina studied acting for four in thet Duoc UC and  the University of the Americas, where she received a degree in Actress with a Mention in Performing Arts. After she finished the university, traveled to the United States to perform a workshop in  Hollywood,  iPop LA, at Roosevelt Hotel, California. With the acquired knowledge, she opened, together with his family, an arts academy, the "Al-Safirah" academy,  in Chile. In addition to doing works for children and adults, he taught classes about everything she had learned about hers life.

 The first interpretive appearance of Catalina in television was in the program "Pasiones" of TVN, to then not stop more until now, unfolding very naturally among her characters.

The big step for the actress was when she won "Cabaret Burlesque", a talent show that was looking for the best Chilean Vedette.
Among a thousand participants, Catalina win the first place, transforming her life towards feathers, glamor, heels and shine. She traveled to France, since that was her prize plus, with a significant amount of money, and she formed his first Varieté called "Cabarieté", invited by the director Patricio Munita, where she meets the Vedette of the Bim Bam Bum "Maggie Lay". Catalina interpreted the nocturnal TV series "Vuelve Temprano", where she played "Ingrid Parra", who was pregnant with the protagonist and acquiring a lot of fame, hers character grew to become in a fundamental character of the central plot.

 Jorrit Smink, a Dutch filmmaker, invited her to participate in "Lo Siento Laura", a film that would initially be interactive, with five hundred scenes, thirty finals, all this available on YouTube. But Jorrit thought that it was better to start with a traditional film and then upload the other options to the internet, for which Catalina was seen on the big screen with her character "Lily", Laura's best friend. They won the first place in the Film Festival in Venezuela, second place in the Cinema Film Festival of Texas, and premiered for the first time at the Comedy Cluj Film Festival in Romania, where they participated in their first red carpet.

 Upon his return to Chile, she participated in the videoclip "Tienes Miedo" of the renowned national group Megapuesta, in order to later take part in several highly successful programs such as: Irreversible, Pobre Gallo, Lo que callamos las mujeres and his recent participation as Marisol Sanchez in the TV series Verdades Ocultas, she has also been invited to several TV shows, being for a time a panelist of the live program The Lao.

Filmography

Film

Shorts

Televisión

Telenovelas

Series

Reality shows and contest programs

TV Shows

Music videos

Commercial Announcements 

 Next (lácteos) (2012) – Protagonist
 AFP Capital Escáner Previsional (AFP) (2013) – Protagonist
 ACHS (2013) - 
 TuSi (2016) – Protagonist

Awards 
 Winner of the TV-show Cabaret Burlesque 2012

References

External links 

 
 Catalina Vera in Twitter
 Catalina Vera in Instagram

Chilean female models
1987 births
People from Santiago
Living people